NAIC may refer to:
 The National Astronomy and Ionosphere Center
 The North American Industry Classification System
 The National Association of Insurance Commissioners
 The National Air Intelligence Center, the former name of National Air and Space Intelligence Center, a USAF intelligence unit
The National Automotive Innovation Centre

Places 
 Naic, Cavite, Philippines